The San Francisco Historical Society is a nonprofit organization dedicated to the preservation, interpretation, and presentation of the history of San Francisco and the surrounding Bay Area. It is a membership-based organization that holds monthly speaking programs, conducts walking tours of San Francisco and publishes original research. It owns the Barbary Coast Trail walking tour and publishes the biannual journal Argonaut.
As of 2021, it has just under 2,000 members.

History

The San Francisco Historical Society was founded in 1988 by historian Charles A. Fracchia.

In February 2002, the San Francisco Historical Society merged with the Museum of the City of San Francisco to create the San Francisco Museum and Historical Society, which the San Francisco municipal government recognized as the official historical museum of San Francisco. One of the purposes of the merger of the two organizations was to put together a single proposal to renovate and operate the Old San Francisco Mint as a history museum.

The San Francisco Museum and Historical Society took over management of the Old Mint in 2004, with plans to make it the museum's permanent home. The organization spent about US$14 million to stabilize and partially renovate the building. However, the building still needed about US$60 million in additional work, and the City of San Francisco concluded the organization was not making progress quickly enough after 11 years of work, so it ordered SFMHS to vacate the building in 2015.

In 2019, the San Francisco Historical Society returned to its original name. In October of that year, the society moved into its first museum space, at 608 Commercial Street, in San Francisco.

References

External links
San Francisco Historical Society

San Francisco
Failed museum proposals in the United States
Non-profit organizations based in San Francisco
Historical societies in California
History of San Francisco